In epistemology (theory of knowledge), a self-evident proposition is a proposition that is known to be true by understanding its meaning without proof, and/or by ordinary human reason.

Some epistemologists deny that any proposition can be self-evident. For most others, one's belief that oneself is conscious is offered as an example of self-evidence. However, one's belief that someone else is conscious is not epistemically self-evident.

The following proposition is often said to be self-evident: "A finite whole is greater than, or equal to, any of its parts".

A logical argument for a self-evident conclusion would demonstrate only an ignorance of the purpose of persuasively arguing for the conclusion based on one or more premises that differ from it (see  and begging the question).

Analytic propositions
It is sometimes said that a self-evident proposition is one whose denial is self-contradictory. It is also sometimes said that an analytic proposition is one whose denial is self-contradictory. But the concepts mean different things, i.e., an analytic proposition is not always a self-evident proposition. 

Provided that one understands and believes a self-evident proposition, self-evident propositions are not in need of proof. Likewise, that their denial is self-contradictory does not need to be proven. It is in this sense that the self-contradictions at work in self-evident and analytic propositions are different.

Not all analytic propositions are self-evident, and it is sometimes claimed that not all self-evident propositions are analytic: e.g. my knowledge that I am conscious.

Other uses

Informal speech
In informal speech, self-evident often merely means obvious, but the epistemological definition is stricter.

Moral propositions
Moral propositions may also be regarded as self-evident, although the is–ought problem described by David Hume considers that there is no coherent way to transition from a positive statement to a normative one.

For example, Alexander Hamilton cited the following moral propositions as self-evident in the Federalist No. 23:
 The means ought to be proportioned to the end.
 Every power ought to be commensurate with its object.
 There ought to be no limitation of a power destined to effect a purpose which is itself incapable of limitation.

A famous claim of the self-evidence of a moral truth is in the United States Declaration of Independence, which states, "We hold these Truths to be self-evident, that all men are created equal, that they are endowed by their Creator with certain unalienable Rights, that among these are Life, Liberty and the pursuit of Happiness."; philosophically, these propositions' self-evidence is debatable.

Mathematics
In mathematics, self-evident means that it needs no proof because the proof is as easy as the statement. For example, any even number is divisible by 2. This statement is self-evident.

See also

 Axiom
 Contradiction
 Foundationalism
 Introspection
 Law of identity
 Primitive notion
 Self-reference
 Self-refuting idea

Notes

Sources of knowledge
Evidence
A priori
Fallacies
Barriers to critical thinking
de:Evidenz